Keith Perry may refer to:

 Keith Perry (musician), American country music and Christian music artist
 Keith Perry (politician) (born 1958), Republican member of the Florida Senate